Waddan may refer to:
Waddan, Libya, a town in Libya
Barbary sheep, the North African Barbary sheep
Invasion of Waddan, a 7th-century battle in modern Saudi Arabia